Tekeste Woldu (born 5 May 1945) is an Ethiopian former cyclist. He competed at the 1968 Summer Olympics and the 1972 Summer Olympics.

References

External links
 

1945 births
Living people
Ethiopian male cyclists
Olympic cyclists of Ethiopia
Cyclists at the 1968 Summer Olympics
Cyclists at the 1972 Summer Olympics
Sportspeople from Asmara
20th-century Ethiopian people